Sonny Odogwu (March 20, 1925 - Nov 5, 2018) was a Nigerian businessman who established SIO Group of Companies, an holding entity with investments in property development, shipping, finance, industrial relations and hotel management.

Odogwu was the publisher of the defunct Post Express Newspapers that was published both in Port Harcourt and Lagos, he tried to use the paper to support the interest of Igbos in Southeastern Nigeria, the newspaper was one of the earliest to embrace web publishing.

Life
Odogwu was born in Cross River State to parents from Delta State, he is a brother to Violet Odogwu. He completed his senior secondary education at Ilesha Grammar School, Ilesha in 1946 and after studies, he joined an insurance firm to work as a trainee. In 1952, he branched out on his own to establish Robert Dyson and Diket, an insurance brokerage firm, in addition, he established trading store as a side business in Lagos Island. Between 1954 and 1958, Odogwu traveled abroad for further studies. Upon his return to Nigeria in 1958, he took up a position of assistant director with C.T. Bowring. He stayed with C.T. Bowring for a year then left to establish his own insurance brokerage outfit called African Insurance Underwriters. In 1965, he added life insurance business to his portfolio, establishing African Prudential Insurance. Odogwu grew his insurance business and started diversifying into other industrial sectors in 1972. By 1984, he had branched out into other industries under Sunny Iwedike Odogwu (SIO) group.

In 2012, Robert Dyson and Diket, Ltd, a firm largely owned by Odogwu signed a financing agreement with a group of creditors including Diamond Bank to finance the construction of Le Meridien Grand Towers Hotel in Lagos. In 2015, a Nigerian high court determined the firm did not fulfill the requirements of the financing and Robert Dyson and Diket was asked to refund Diamond Bank a total of 26.2 billion naira.

Sunny Odogwu died on the 6th of November, 2018.

References

Nigerian businesspeople